"Ne ver', ne boysia" also known as "Ne ver', ne boisia, i ne prosi" ("Don't believe, don't fear and don't ask") is a song by t.A.T.u., which they performed at Eurovision Song Contest 2003 representing .

Production 
The title of the song is based on a Russian prison saying, which entered Russian mainstream culture due to Aleksandr Solzhenitsyn's book The Gulag Archipelago. The term has also been interpreted as a reference to the repression faced by the LGBTQ community.

According to Australian-born Mars Lasar, the song was produced by him and Ivan Shapovalov by sending MP3s over the internet to each other, with Lasar in the U.S. and Shapovalov in Russia. There are several versions of the song, including the promotional version that was used for Eurovision promotions.

Release 
The song was first released on the UK Maxi single for "Not Gonna Get Us" on May 19, 2003. It was then released on the UK Deluxe Edition of 200 km/h in the Wrong Lane on May 26, 2003. It was then released on November 25, 2003 in t.A.T.u. Remixes. The song reappeared in 2006 on The Best.

The only physical single for "Ne ver', ne boysia" was a 'not for sale' promo release distributed for Eurovision.

Track listing

Music video
The song has a music video that contains videos of wars, accidents, and other pictures of the real world, as well as videos of Lena Katina and Julia Volkova. The video is on both t.A.T.u.'s official MySpace and YouTube pages.

Credits

Eurovision Song Contest 2003
t.A.T.u represented Russia at the Eurovision Song Contest 2003 with this song. In his 2017 book Eurovision! A History of Modern Europe Through the World’s Greatest Song Contest, author Chris West suggested that the group's selection to represent Russia in the contest was partly intended to counter accusations of Russian cultural conservatism. Australian professor Bronwyn Winter suggested that the entry could be interpreted as "a mild protest song", in that the artists' lesbian image contrasted with Russia's gender norms. The song was initially considered a favorite to win the contest.

It was the eleventh song performed on the night, following 's Lou with "Let's Get Happy" and preceding 's Beth with "Dime". The group reportedly arrived late to rehearsals in the lead-up to the show, and threatened to deliver their performance naked; they ultimately opted to perform in T-shirts with the number one on them and old jeans, while holding hands. Their live performance was booed by some audience members, while their outfit later earned them the annual Barbara Dex Award for worst-dressed Eurovision contestants. 

At the close of the voting, the song had received 164 points, placing it 3rd in a field of 26. The UK and Ireland were the only countries in the contest not to vote for the song. This led to complaints from the Russian officials which then led to the BBC and RTÉ revealing the full order of how the countries had voted (something which they had never done before or since). The Russian entry was in neither of their top ten lists. If this had not been the case, there would have been a good chance that the song could have won. West posited that the group's third-place finish "was a reward for pre-existing notoriety rather than for anything they brought to Latvia."

Charts

References

External links
 
 Official lyrics (in Cyrillic)
 Studio version lyrics with English translation
 Lyrics as sung at the Eurovision Song Contest 2003 with English translation

Eurovision songs of Russia
Eurovision songs of 2003
T.A.T.u. songs
2003 singles
Songs written by Valery Polienko
Songs written by Ivan Shapovalov
2003 songs
Universal Music Group singles
Russian-language songs